"Cupid" is a song by American singer Sam Cooke, released on May 16, 1961. It charted at number 17 on the Billboard Hot 100 and number 20 on the Hot R&B Sides chart; the track performed best in the United Kingdom, peaking at number seven on the UK Singles Chart. Cooke's producers had asked him to write a song for a girl they had seen on a Perry Como TV show—but once they heard her sing, they kept "Cupid" for Cooke himself.

Personnel on the recording included Cooke's session regulars Clifton White and Rene Hall on guitar, Clifford Hills on bass, Earl Palmer on drums and Joseph Gibbons on guitar and banjo.

"Cupid" was ranked at number 452 in Rolling Stone magazine's list of the "500 Greatest Songs of All Time" in 2004 and at number 458 in 2010. AllMusic critic Bill Janovitz described the track as a "perfect pop song" which combines "Latin, R&B, jazz, and mainstream pop elements".

Charts and certifications

Weekly charts

Year-end charts

Cover versions

 In 1964, Johnny Rivers covered the song on his live album In Action.
 In 1965, The Supremes covered the song on their tribute album We Remember Sam Cooke.
 In 1970, Johnny Nash's rocksteady and reggae version, released in late 1969, peaked at number 39 on the Hot 100 on January 24, 1970. In the United Kingdom, this version peaked at number 6 in May 1969.  It was the B-side to his hit song "Hold Me Tight".
 In 1975, Gary Glitter covered the song on his album G.G..
 In 1976, Dawn's cover peaked at number 22 on the Hot 100 on March 20–27, 1976 and number two on the Easy Listening chart.
 In 1980, the song was covered, in a medley with Michael Zager's "I've Loved You For a Long Time", by The Spinners. This version went to number four on July 19 - August 2, 1980, on the Hot 100, thus becoming the highest-charting version on the Hot 100, and number five on the R&B chart.
 Otis Redding was also known for covering a number of Cooke's songs including "Cupid". His cover was included on the 1993 box set Otis! The Definitive Otis Redding.
 In 2007, British singer Amy Winehouse included a cover of Johnny Nash's version of the song for the deluxe edition of her album Back to Black.

Other
This song's melody is interpolated in the Carly Rae Jepsen song "Tiny Little Bows" from the album Kiss.

References

External links
 
 
 
 

1961 songs
1961 singles
1969 singles
1976 singles
1980 singles
Sam Cooke songs
The Spinners (American group) songs
Amy Winehouse songs
Songs written by Sam Cooke
RCA Victor singles
Elektra Records singles
Atlantic Records singles
Cupid in music